Poor man's copyright is a method of using registered dating by the postal service, a notary public or other highly trusted source to date intellectual property, thereby helping to establish that the material has been in one's possession since a particular time. The concept is based on the notion that, in the event that such intellectual property were to be misused by a third party, the poor-man's copyright would at least establish a legally recognized date of possession before any proof which a third party may possess.

In countries with no central copyright registration authority, it can be difficult for an author to prove when their work was created. The United Kingdom Patent Office says this:

... a copy could be deposited with a bank or solicitor. Alternatively, a creator could send himself or herself a copy by special delivery post (which gives a clear date stamp on the envelope), leaving the envelope unopened on its return. A number of private companies operate unofficial registers, but it would be sensible to check carefully what you will be paying for before choosing this route.

It is important to note, that this does not prove that a work is original or created by you...

There is no provision in United States copyright law regarding any such type of protection. A work of original authorship is protected by United States copyright law once it is fixed in a tangible medium of expression. According to section 412 of the U.S. Copyright Act of 1976 (17 U.S.C. 408), registration of a work with the Copyright Office is a prerequisite for copyright protection. Poor man's copyright is therefore not a substitute for registration. Eric Goldman has noted that there is an absence of cases that give any value to the poor man's copyright. He also states, "To establish copyright infringement, the author must show copying-in-fact and wrongful copying. The postmark has no relevance to the wrongful copying question." However, according to the Copyright Alliance, the postmark could provide some value in an infringement action if it is used as evidence that the work existed on a particular date, or before the date of creation of another work.

See also 
 Copyright registration
 Soleau envelope

References

External links 
 US Copyright Office
 Canadian Intellectual Property Office
 UK Intellectual Property Office
 10 Common Copyright Myths - UK Copyright Service

Authentication methods
Copyright law
Postal systems